Josef Müller (6 May 1893 – 22 March 1984) was a German international footballer and coach.

Career 
In 1926 his club SpVgg Fürth was crowned German football champion. In the final Müller's team beat Hertha BSC 4–1 in Frankfurt.

Müller won 12 caps with the Germany national team between September 1921 and April 1928. He was also part of Germany's team at the 1928 Summer Olympics, but he did not play in any matches.

References

External links
 
 
 
 

1893 births
1984 deaths
Sportspeople from Würzburg
Association football defenders
German footballers
Germany international footballers
Olympic footballers of Germany
Footballers at the 1928 Summer Olympics
SV Werder Bremen players
German football managers
SV Werder Bremen managers
Stuttgarter Kickers managers
Footballers from Bavaria